The University of Michigan College of Engineering, branded as Michigan Engineering, is the engineering wing of the University of Michigan, a public research university in Ann Arbor, Michigan. With an enrollment of 7,133 undergraduate and 3,537 graduate students, the College of Engineering is one of the premier engineering schools in the United States. The College of Engineering is ranked No. 7 in the United States by U.S. News & World Report in its 2021 publication.

The college was founded in 1854, with courses in civil engineering. Since its founding, the College of Engineering established some of the earliest programs in various fields such as data science, computer science, electrical engineering, and nuclear engineering. The college's aerospace engineering program celebrated its 100th anniversary in 2014. The Materials Science and Engineering program is the oldest continuing metallurgy and materials program in the United States.

The college was first located on the University's Central Campus before moving to the University's North Campus — which occupies approximately 800 acres (3.25 km²)— starting in the late 1940s. Today, the College of Engineering is prominently located in the center of the University's North Campus (the Marine Hydrodynamics Laboratory is located on Central Campus), which is shared with the School of Music, Theatre and Dance, School of Art and Design, and the Taubman College of Architecture and Urban Planning. The North Campus also houses Lurie Tower, one of 2 grand carillons on the Ann Arbor campus, and one of only 23 in the world.

The college's Office of Student Affairs offers an optional alumni interview program, called Hometown Alumni Involvement Link (HAIL), to select first-year applicants for informational purposes.

Deans
Dr. Alec D. Gallimore currently holds the position of Robert J. Vlasic Dean of Engineering. Appointed in 2016, he is the eighteenth dean to serve the College.

Gallimore joined Big 10+ engineering deans in submitting a letter to the Accreditation Board for Engineering and Technology in March 2021, recommending that they add diversity, equity and inclusion requirements for accreditation of engineering programs. Under his leadership Michigan Engineering has established equity-centered engineering as a guiding philosophy at the College that seeks to approach engineering with an intent to close—rather than unintentionally expand—societal gaps.

 1895-1903	Charles Ezra Greene
 1903-1928	Mortimer E. Cooley
 1927-1928	George W. Patterson, Acting Dean
 1928-1937	Herbert Charles Sadler
 1937-1939	Henry C. Anderson
 1940-1951	Ivan C. Crawford
 1951-1957	George Granger Brown
 1957-1965	Stephen S. Attwood
 1965-1972	Gordon Van Wylen
 1972-1980	David V. Ragone
 1980-1981	Hansford W. Farris, Acting Dean
 1981-1986	James J. Duderstadt
 1986-1989	Charles M. Vest
 1989-1990	Daniel E. Atkins, III, Interim Dean
 1990-1996	Peter M. Banks
 1996-2005	Stephen W. Director
 2006-2016	David C. Munson, Jr.
 2016-	Alec D. Gallimore

Academic programs

The college grants degrees at the Bachelor's, Master's, and PhD levels.  The 17 undergraduate degree programs offered by the college are:

Aerospace Engineering
Biomedical Engineering
Chemical Engineering
Civil Engineering
Climate and Meteorology 
Computer Engineering
Computer Science
Data Science
Electrical Engineering
Engineering Physics
Environmental Engineering
Industrial and Operations Engineering
Materials Science and Engineering
Mechanical Engineering
Naval Architecture and Marine Engineering
Nuclear Engineering and Radiological Sciences
Space Science and Engineering
Transportation Research Institute

Almost all of these programs are ranked in the top ten in the United States according to U.S. News & World Report.

Laboratories and facilities
Various laboratories are located at the college of engineering, including the Center for Wireless Integrated MicroSystems (WIMS) and the Center for Reconfigurable Manufacturing Systems (RMS), both of which are NSF laboratories. Another major laboratory is the Center for Ultra-Fast Optical Sciences. The Phoenix Memorial Laboratory is a laboratory dedicated to research into the peaceful use of nuclear technology. It once housed the Ford Nuclear Reactor, which was decommissioned in 2003.

The College of Engineering also has 11 wind tunnels, electron microscope and ion beam laboratories, a civil engineering test facility, and solid state manufacturing facilities. Various laboratories dedicated to automotive engineering, neutron science, optical sciences, and robotics are scattered throughout the college. A hydrodynamics laboratory is located on the University's Central Campus. An office of the Weather Underground is located at the College of Engineering.

The Duderstadt Center, formerly the Media Union and affectionately known as "The Dude" by engineering students, is named after former University president and nuclear engineering professor James Duderstadt.  It houses the Art, Architecture & Engineering Library and also contains computer clusters, audio and video editing laboratories, galleries, and studios, as well as usability and various digital media laboratories, including virtual reality. The Millennium Project, which focuses on the future of the university learning environment, is also housed in the Duderstadt Center.

Computer services and networking is provided by CAEN, the Computer Aided Engineering Network. CAEN operates various computer laboratories throughout the College of Engineering and the University campuses. As of 2007, CAEN no longer maintains separate mail servers for CoE students and faculty. 

The University of Michigan, partnering with the Michigan Department of Transportation, opened a 32-acre proving ground test course for autonomous cars in 2015 called Mcity on the site of a former Pfizer facility which the University purchased in 2009. Mcity contains five miles of roads and includes a mock town square, tunnel, highway exit ramps, a railroad crossing, gravel roadway, traffic circle, roundabout, and other obstacles. Faculty and engineering students will utilize Mcity to work on projects and to collaborate with automakers and suppliers who will test vehicle technology at the course.

In 2019 professors Elliot Soloway and Cathie Norris founded the University of Michigan Center for Digital Curricula under the auspices of the University of Michigan College of Engineering for the purposes of building fully digital open curricula. This curricula is primarily designed to be delivered using the Collabrify Roadmaps software platform developed by the Norris and Soloway in the mid 2010s.

Honor Code
College of Engineering students are required to understand and adhere to an Honor Code governing the completion of classwork and examinations, as well as conduct when using CAEN computers. Students observing a violation of the Honor Code are required by the Honor Code to report it.

During examinations, the College of Engineering differs from other University of Michigan academic units in that the instructor is typically not present in the room (i.e., the exam is not proctored). Instructors tell students their location during the examination, such as in their office or sitting in the hallway, in case there are questions. Students are guaranteed at least one empty seat between themselves and the next closest person. Minimal conversation is allowed, given that it does not concern the content of the examination. Students can also leave and re-enter the room without permission.

The following Honor Pledge, or a variation of it, must be written and signed on an exam (or occasionally other assignments) before it will be graded: "I have neither given nor received any unauthorized aid on this (exam/assignment/etc.), nor have I concealed any violations of the Honor Code."

All assignments, whether submitted in writing or electronically, for a lecture or laboratory class, must be the product of the student's own work, unless collaboration is specifically allowed by the instructor. If collaboration is allowed, the instructor will specify the degree to which it is allowed. In addition, all sources of ideas as well as direct quotations must be cited.

Tampering with CAEN computers or attempting to illegally copy licensed software from them is also considered a violation of the Honor Code.

If suspected of an Honor Code violation, an Honor Council member will be assigned to the incident and attempt to gather information on the incident. The student(s) involved will then be required to appear before the students in the Honor Council. The Council gives its decision to the Faculty Committee on Discipline, who makes the final determination of punishment, if any, for the student(s). If desired, the student(s) can waive the Honor Council hearing and go directly to the Committee. The student(s) then receive the decision by mail.

Honor Council records are confidential and not placed in the student's regular file.

Student organizations
There are student branches of various professional organizations such as AIAA, IEEE and ASME, minority groups such as SWE, NSBE and oStem as well as honor societies such as Tau Beta Pi and Epeians, the Engineering Leadership Honor Society at Michigan. Most are housed in Pierpont Commons (the student union on North Campus) or in "The Bullpen" in the Electrical Engineering and Computer Science (EECS) building. Engineering Student Government (ESG), represents the student body of the College of Engineering, also has an office in the EECS building.

Many multidisciplinary engineering project teams are primarily housed in the Wilson Student Project Center. Several major project teams include: 
 Michigan Health Engineered for All Lives (M-HEAL)
 BLUELab
 Baja SAE Team
 Concrete Canoe
 MRacing Team - Formula SAE 
 Michigan Electric Racing Team (Combined with M-Racing in 2021) 
 Michigan Mars Rover Team
 Michigan Robotic Submarine
 Steel Bridge
 Engineering Global Leadership Honors Program (EGL)
 University of Michigan Solar Car Team
 Michigan Aeronautical Science Association
 University of Michigan Supermileage Team - Shell Eco-Marathon
 MFly 
 UM::Autonomy
 Human Powered Submarine
 Human Powered Helicopter

The Michigan Baja Racing team is among the top performing teams nationally. In 2013, the team placed first overall in season points, including two first-place finishes in the four-hour endurance race - the highlight and main focus of each competition. In 2014, the team placed a close second overall in the season, and in 2015, the team placed first again overall in season points. The 2015 season included two out of three competition wins, with three podium finishes including one win in the design event. The 2015 car continued to push the boundaries of the team from a design perspective, including an axially-stressed drive shaft, custom brake calipers, and custom CVT flyweights that gave the team a significant competitive advantage. The 2016 season brings the team to Tennessee, California, and New York. Michigan Baja Racing

In 2006, the UM Human Powered Submarine Team won the International Submarine Races. Radio Aurora Explorer (RAX), a University of Michigan designed and fabricated Cubesat, is the first National Science Foundation sponsored CubeSat mission.

Additionally, over 1/3 of the Michigan Marching Band consists of Michigan Engineers.

Recurring events
Tech Day is an event held by the college each fall inviting prospective high school students and their parents, as well as prospective college transfer students, to explore Michigan Engineering. Tech Day brings over 500 prospective students (and over 500 of their parents) together on campus to talk to current students and faculty about the various engineering programs, as well as take part in demonstrations and exhibits showcasing each department.

The SWE/TBP Career Fair is an engineering career fair held each fall as a collaboration between the University of Michigan Student Section of the Society of Women Engineers and the Michigan Gamma chapter of Tau Beta Pi. The event began in 1986 and has grown to be one of the largest student-run career fairs in the country, hosting nearly 300 companies each year.

The Engineering Research Symposium is a one-day event that began in 2006 and features student research from the undergraduate through PhD levels, including poster presentations, scientific visualizations, and dissertation work in department-nominated oral and poster presentations.

.

See also
Engineering
Glossary of engineering
List of University of Michigan people - People associated with the college are marked with COE

Notes

References
The University of Michigan College of Engineering Bulletin 2004-05. Vol. 33, number 2. Ann Arbor, Michigan: Marketing Communications (University of Michigan), July 7, 2004.
History of Operations Research in the Department of Industrial and Operations Engineering at the University of Michigan. The Institute for Operations Research and the Management Sciences (INFORMS) web site, accessed September 13, 2019.

External links
Michigan Engineering
Map and Virtual Tour of the College

Engineering, University of Michigan College of
Engineering schools and colleges in the United States
Engineering universities and colleges in Michigan
Educational institutions established in 1854
1854 establishments in Michigan
University of Michigan campus